Erich Lindemann (born 2 May 1900 in Witten, Germany) was a German-American writer and psychiatrist, specializing in bereavement.  He worked at Massachusetts General Hospital in Boston as the Chief of Psychiatry and is noted for his extensive study on the effects of traumatic events on survivors and families after the Cocoanut Grove night club fire in 1942. His contributions to the field of mental health led to the naming of a joint Harvard University–Commonwealth of Massachusetts-run mental health complex in Boston in his honor, the Erich Lindemann Mental Health Center.

Education
Lindemann was a graduate of the University hospital Gießen und Marburg and the Academy of Medicine in Düsseldorf, earning his doctorate in psychology in 1922 and his doctorate in medicine in 1927. In the same year he earned a fellowship to Harvard Medical School, and in 1929 made his move to the United States permanent.

Work
Author of "Symptomatology and Management of Acute Grief", a paper on posttraumatic stress disorder.  It was published in September 1944.

Studied the survivors of the Cocoanut Grove fire (1942), which was the deadliest nightclub fire in United States history.

References

External links
 David George Satin, M.D. Erich Lindemann: The Humanist and the Era of Community Mental Health, Proceedings of the American Philosophical Society, Vol. 126, Number 4, Aug. 1982
 Grief, Macmillan Encyclopedia of Death and Dying, 2003
 S. Fleck, Erich Lindemann 1900–1974, Social Psychiatry and Psychiatric Epidemiology, Volume 10, Number 3, 153, 
Erich Lindemann papers, 1885-1991 (inclusive), 1950-1974 (bulk). H MS c219. Harvard Medical Library, Francis A. Countway Library of Medicine, Boston, Mass.

American psychiatrists
German psychiatrists
1974 deaths
Harvard Medical School alumni
Physicians of Massachusetts General Hospital
1900 births
20th-century American physicians
German emigrants to the United States